Juris Cibuļs (born December 6, 1951 in Rekova) is a Latvian publicist, humanist, linguist and translator.

Early life and education 
Juris Cibuļs was born in Rekova, Latvian SSR. He studied at the University of Latvia.

Organizations
In 1978 Cibuļs was a member of the National Geographic Society. From 1989 to 1992 he was a member of the Council of People's Deputies in  Balvi District. In 1995 he was a member of Maledicta and Amici Linguarum.

Career
From 1985 to 1990 Cibuļs was a reporter of Skolotāju Avīze (Teacher's Newspaper).

From 1989 to 1990 he was deputy head of the local unit of the Popular Front of Latvia in Balvi District.

In 1990 he was MP in the Supreme Council of the Latvian Soviet Socialist Republic.

In 1994 Cibuļs was appointed to as a coordinator of the Department of Foreign Affairs in the Naturalization Office of the  Republic of Latvia.

Books
In 1992 he published a Latgalian alphabet book together with Lideja Leikuma.

In 2003 he wrote the book Vasals! on the grammar of the Latgalian Language.

Collection 
Cibuļs collects alphabet books in different languages. Currently there are 8000 from 210 countries in 970 languages and dialects. His collection has been presented in more than 170 exhibitions and museums.

National Honours 

 Order of the Three Stars (2000)
 Commemorative Medal for Participants of the Barricades of 1991

Bibliography 
 Latgalīšu ābece (lementars): eksper. māc. grām. divās daļās / Jurs Cybuļs, Lideja Leikuma. — Lielvārde: Lielvārds (1992)
 Īdzer veina, lai dzeive ira feina! / Jurs Cybuļs, Juons Ločmeļs. — R.: b.i. (1999)
 Vasals! Latgaliešu valodas mācība / J. Cibuļs, L. Leikuma. — R.: N.I.M.S. (2003)
 Brīnumainā valodu pasaule. B.v.: Raudava (2004)
 Latgaliešu ābeces (1768—2008). R.: Zinātne (2009)

References

External links
 Статья Ю. Цыбульса о проблеме «язык или диалект» Izloksne, dialekts, svešvaloda.... 08.12.2009. Latvijas avīze

1951 births
Living people
People from Viļaka Municipality
Popular Front of Latvia politicians
Deputies of the Supreme Council of the Republic of Latvia
Latvian writers
University of Latvia alumni